The Hall County Jail, on Bradford St. in Gainesville, Georgia, also known as the Old Hall County Jail, is an Art Deco-style building built in 1934–1935. It was listed on the National Register of Historic Places in 1985.

It was designed by architect William J.J. Chase and was partially funded by the Federal Emergency Administration of the Public Works Administration.

It was used as a jail until 1981.

References

National Register of Historic Places in Hall County, Georgia

Jails in Georgia (U.S. state)
Buildings and structures completed in 1935
Art Deco architecture in Georgia (U.S. state)